Cannabis in Peru is not legal for recreational use, possession for own consumption is also decriminalized by the Criminal Code and medical cannabis was legalized in 2017.

Enforcement
Possession of under 8 grams is considered personal use and it is not punished.

Cultivation, production or sale is punished with 8 to 15 years in prison.

Medical cannabis
In 2017, the administration of President Pedro Pablo Kuczynski announced a plan to legalize medical cannabis in Peru. The announcement followed a raid in Lima, in which police shut down an operation which produced cannabis medicines for 80 members whose children suffered from epilepsy and other ailments. Later that year, by a vote of 68 to 5, Peru's congress legalized cannabis oil for medical use.

In June 2021, Cannabis & Co. opened the first legal dispensary in Peru for the sale of medicinal marijuana after obtaining signed consent (permits) from the following four Peruvian government entities: 

 General Directorate of Medicines
 Supplies and Drugs (Digemid)
 Ministry of Health (Minsa)
 Anti-Drug Directorate of the National Police

For the grand opening, Cannabis & Co. registered three Cannabis brands from three different countries; Futura Farms (Peru), Epifractan (Uruguay), and Cannabidiol Life (United States).

References

Peru
Politics of Peru
Society of Peru
Peru
Peru